Nowe Książki (meaning New Books in English) is a journal of new publications in Polish. It is a monthly magazine published by the National Library of Poland. The magazine was started in 1949. The headquarters of the monthly is in Warsaw.

See also 
List of literary magazines

References

External links
 WorldCat record

1949 establishments in Poland
Book review magazines
Magazines established in 1949
Magazines published in Warsaw
Monthly magazines published in Poland
Visual arts magazines published in Poland
Polish-language magazines
Literary magazines published in Poland